College Tour is a TV-show in the Netherlands, that interviews the most high-profile Dutch and international guests. Inspired by town hall meetings during United States elections, the majority of questions are asked by the audience. The show is hosted by news anchor Twan Huys, who conceived its format while working as U.S. correspondent in New York and Washington D.C. from 1999–2007.

Similar to Inside the Actors Studio, College Tour typically features one guest per episode, and an audience of a few hundred students — however guests can be from all walks of life, including politicians, entrepreneurs, musicians and lawyers. Foreign guests have included Bill Gates, Shimon Peres, Sting and the Dalai Lama. Dutch interviews have featured football legend Johan Cruijff, astronaut André Kuipers and formerly Dutch activist Ayaan Hirsi Ali.

Although College Tour aims to be weekly, episodes are only produced as sufficiently interesting guests can be found available. It is claimed that audience questions are not pre-screened, and there is no censorship on language used. Interviews with international celebrities are done completely in English, including the questions posed by the audience. Broadcasts feature the original sound with Dutch subtitles — there is no audio dubbing. Commercial breaks are absent.
Recording takes place in varying venues — frequently (movie) theatres, conference rooms, or sometimes a church. Occasionally the show is taken abroad to meet up with stars who are willing, but unable to visit the Netherlands. In a few cases, special venues were arranged, for instance when Da Vinci Code writer Dan Brown was interviewed in the Amsterdam Rijksmuseum, in front of famous painting The Night Watch.

Episodes

External links
 College Tour episodes online
 College Tour official YouTube channel

References

2007 Dutch television series debuts
Dutch television talk shows
NPO 3 original programming